Krakowiec-Górki Zachodnie ( and Westlich Neufähr) is one of the administrative districts (dzielnica administracyjna) in the city of Gdańsk.

Location 
The north of the quarter is bordered by the Bay of Gdańsk. From the east, it is bordered by the district of Wyspa Sobieszewska (Sobieszewo Island), from the south by Rudniki and from the west by Stogi on Port Island (Wyspa Portowa).

From the east it is bordered by the Śmiała Wisła (Daring Vistula) and from the south by the Dead Vistula (two distributary river branches of the Vistula).

History 
The eastern border was created in 1840 during the flooding and creation of a new mouth of Vistula. The Dead Vistula was closed by a lock and became a dead branch.

The area became a part of Danzig in 1914. Krakau had a population of 536 (1910) and Westlich Neufähr of 727 (1905).

The shipyard Stocznia Wisła was established in 1945. A second shipyard is Stocznia jachtowa . The national center for sailing Narodowe Centrum Żeglarstwa Akademii Wychowania Fizycznego i Sportu (AWFiS) was established in 2006.

Tourism 
Tourist attractions:
Marina of Gdańsk, the national center for sailing with Akademicki Klub Morski
Gdańsk tramwaj wodny, the water tramway between the marina and the city of Gdańsk in summer (since 2012)
Jezioro Bursztynowe, a lake.

Gallery

External links 

 Podział administracyjny Gdańska (Polish)
 gedanopedia.pl: Górki Zachodnie (Polish)
 gedanopedia.pl: Krakowiec (Polish)

Districts of Gdańsk